An election of the delegation from Finland to the European Parliament was held in 2009.

Finland uses the open list D'Hondt method, where voters vote for an individual, but the individual's vote is counted primarily for the party and secondarily for the candidate. Parties receive seats in proportion to their share of the vote, and candidates from those parties are selected based on the votes they received individually. In European Parliament elections, the whole country forms a single constituency.

Result
Compared to the 2004 European Parliament election in Finland, the three major parties National Coalition Party, Centre Party, and Social Democrats (SDP) each lost a seat. Moreover, the most popular candidate on the SDP list was the independent Mitro Repo. The Left Alliance lost their only seat. The Greens gained a seat, the Christian Democrats regained the seat they had lost in the previous period, and the True Finns achieved their first entry to the European Parliament with one seat. The Swedish People's Party kept their single seat. No extraparliamentary party gained any seats.

Elected MEPs
 Ville Itälä (National Coalition Party)
 Sirpa Pietikäinen (National Coalition Party)
 Eija-Riitta Korhola (National Coalition Party)
 Anneli Jäätteenmäki (Centre Party)
 Hannu Takkula (Centre Party)
 Riikka Manner (Centre Party)
 Mitro Repo (Social Democratic Party, independent)
 Liisa Jaakonsaari (Social Democratic Party)
 Heidi Hautala (Green League)
 Satu Hassi (Green League)
 Timo Soini (Finns Party)
 Sari Essayah (Christian Democrats)
 Carl Haglund (Swedish People's Party)

Most voted-for candidates

References

Finland
European Parliament elections in Finland
European